David Mogotlane (born 11 February 1992) is a South African cricketer. He made his first-class debut for Easterns in the 2016–17 Sunfoil 3-Day Cup on 27 October 2016.

References

External links
 

1992 births
Living people
South African cricketers
Easterns cricketers
Cricketers from Johannesburg